Adlington is a village and civil parish in the unitary authority of Cheshire East and the ceremonial county of Cheshire, England.  It is known as Eduluintune in the Domesday Book. According to the 2001 census the civil parish had a population of 1,081 people across 401 households. There is a mixed, non-denominational primary school in the village.

A railway station, located on the Manchester–Stoke-On-Trent line, is used mainly by commuters to Manchester and Stockport.

History

Adlington was a chapelry and township in Prestbury ancient parish.  It became a separate civil parish in 1866, and had slight changes to its civil parish boundaries in 1936. It was in Hamestan hundred, which later became Macclesfield Hundred and, later still, was assigned to be part of Macclesfield Poor Law Union and Rural Sanitary District. When Macclesfield Rural District council was established in 1894, Adlington became a civil parish within it.  In 1974, local government re-organisation led to it becoming part of the Borough of Macclesfield, which in turn was succeeded by Cheshire East Council in 2009.

Adlington Hall, dating from at least the end of the 13th century, is located at the western end of the village.

Adlington made the news in January 2008, when a delivery vehicle shed 18 tonnes of mango chutney onto the road through the village. A spokesman for F Swain and Sons, the company which owns the lorry, said: "It was just one of those things."

Governance
Adlington Parish Council, which administers the civil parish, is made up of ten parish councillors and one parish clerk. The parish council sits each month, and at these meetings, the two borough and single county councillor will also often attend.

See also

Listed buildings in Adlington, Cheshire

References

Notes

Bibliography

External links

 Map of Adlington
 

Villages in Cheshire
Towns and villages of the Peak District
Civil parishes in Cheshire